Scorpion de Bey is a Cameroonian football club. They are a member of the Cameroonian Football Federation and Elite One, the topflight football league of Cameroon.

Stadium
Currently the team plays at the 20,000 capacity Roumdé Adjia Stadium.

References

External links

Football clubs in Cameroon
Sports clubs in Cameroon